Stadio Giuseppe Voltini is a multi-use stadium in Crema, Lombardy, northern Italy.  It is currently used mostly for football matches and is the home ground of A.C. Crema 1908 and U.S. Pergolettese 1932.  The stadium holds 4,100.

Giuseppe Voltini